The 2016 Kentucky Democratic presidential primary was held on May 17 in the U.S. state of Kentucky as one of the Democratic Party's primaries ahead of the 2016 presidential election.

On the same day, the Democratic Party held their Oregon primary. The Republican Party held their Kentucky caucuses in early March.

Opinion polling

Results

Results by county

Analysis
Clinton's strength with conservative white voters in the Appalachia region, including Coal Country, had clearly regressed since 2008; she had beaten Barack Obama 65-29 in Kentucky eight years earlier, and only beat rival Bernie Sanders 47-46 in 2016. She ran strongly in Louisville, where the African American population is highest, but lost many of the Eastern Kentucky Coalfield counties in the state to Bernie Sanders, who had won a large victory in neighboring West Virginia the week prior. Sanders also won many counties in the Jackson Purchase area. Notably, in 2012, almost all of the Sanders counties voted for the "Uncommited" ballot option in a protest vote against Obama.

References

Kentucky
Democratic primary
2016